In geometry and group theory, a lattice in the real coordinate space  is an infinite set of points in this space with the properties that coordinate wise addition or subtraction of two points in the lattice produces another lattice point, that the lattice points are all separated by some minimum distance, and that every point in the space is within some maximum distance of a lattice point. Closure under addition and subtraction means that a lattice must be a subgroup of the additive group of the points in the space, and the requirements of minimum and maximum distance can be summarized by saying that a lattice is a Delone set. More abstractly, a lattice can be described as a free abelian group of dimension  which spans the vector space . A lattice may be viewed as a regular tiling of a space by a primitive cell.

Lattices have many significant applications in pure mathematics, particularly in connection to Lie algebras, number theory and group theory. They also arise in applied mathematics in connection with coding theory, in percolation theory to study connectivity arising from small-scale interactions, cryptography because of conjectured computational hardness of several lattice problems, and are used in various ways in the physical sciences. For instance, in materials science and solid-state physics, a lattice is a synonym for the "framework of a crystalline structure, a 3-dimensional array of regularly spaced points coinciding in special cases with the atom or molecule positions in a crystal. More generally, lattice models are studied in physics, often by the techniques of computational physics.

Symmetry considerations and examples
A lattice is the symmetry group of discrete translational symmetry in n directions. A pattern with this lattice of translational symmetry cannot have more, but may have less symmetry than the lattice itself.

A lattice in the sense of a 3-dimensional array of regularly spaced points coinciding with e.g. the atom or molecule positions in a crystal, or more generally, the orbit of a group action under translational symmetry, is a translation of the translation lattice: a coset, which need not contain the origin, and therefore need not be a lattice in the previous sense.

The period lattice iit is central to the study of elliptic functions, developed in nineteenth century mathematics; it generalizes to higher dimensions in the theory of abelian functions. Lattices called root lattices are important in the theory of simple Lie algebras; for example, the E8 lattice is related to a Lie algebra that goes by the same name.

Dividing space according to a lattice
A typical lattice  in  thus has the form

Different bases can generate the same lattice, but the absolute value of the determinant of the vectors vi is uniquely determined by Λ, and is denoted by d(Λ).
If one thinks of a lattice as dividing the whole of  into equal polyhedra (copies of an n-dimensional parallelepiped, known as the fundamental region of the lattice), then d(Λ) is equal to the n-dimensional volume of this polyhedron.  This is why d(Λ) is sometimes called the covolume of the lattice.  If this equals 1, the lattice is called unimodular.

Lattice points in convex sets
Minkowski's theorem relates the number d(Λ) and the volume of a symmetric convex set S to the number of lattice points contained in S. The number of lattice points contained in a polytope all of whose vertices are elements of the lattice is described by the polytope's Ehrhart polynomial. Formulas for some of the coefficients of this polynomial involve d(Λ) as well.

Computational lattice problems

Computational lattice problems have many applications in computer science. For example, the Lenstra–Lenstra–Lovász lattice basis reduction algorithm (LLL) has been used in the cryptanalysis of many public-key encryption schemes, and many lattice-based cryptographic schemes are known to be secure under the assumption that certain lattice problems are computationally difficult.

Lattices in two dimensions: detailed discussion

There are five 2D lattice types as given by the crystallographic restriction theorem. Below, the wallpaper group of the lattice is given in IUC notation, Orbifold notation, and Coxeter notation, along with a wallpaper diagram showing the symmetry domains. Note that a pattern with this lattice of translational symmetry cannot have more, but may have less symmetry than the lattice itself. A full list of subgroups is available. For example below the hexagonal/triangular lattice is given twice, with full 6-fold and a half 3-fold reflectional symmetry. If the symmetry group of a pattern contains an n-fold rotation then the lattice has n-fold symmetry for even n and 2n-fold for odd n.

For the classification of a given lattice, start with one point and take a nearest second point. For the third point, not on the same line, consider its distances to both points. Among the points for which the smaller of these two distances is least, choose a point for which the larger of the two is least. (Not logically equivalent but in the case of lattices giving the same result is just "Choose a point for which the larger of the two is least".)

The five cases correspond to the triangle being equilateral, right isosceles, right, isosceles, and scalene. In a rhombic lattice, the shortest distance may either be a diagonal or a side of the rhombus, i.e., the line segment connecting the first two points may or may not be one of the equal sides of the isosceles triangle. This depends on the smaller angle of the rhombus being less than 60° or between 60° and 90°.

The general case is known as a period lattice. If the vectors p and q generate the lattice, instead of p and q we can also take p and p-q, etc. In general in 2D, we can take a p + b q and c p + d q for integers a,b, c and d such that ad-bc is 1 or -1. This ensures that p and q themselves are integer linear combinations of the other two vectors.  Each pair p, q defines a parallelogram, all with the same area, the magnitude of the cross product. One parallelogram fully defines the whole  object. Without further symmetry, this parallelogram is a fundamental parallelogram.

The vectors p and q can be represented by complex numbers. Up to size and orientation, a pair can be represented by their quotient. Expressed geometrically: if two lattice points are 0 and 1, we consider the position of a third lattice point. Equivalence in the sense of generating the same lattice is represented by the modular group:  represents choosing a different third point in the same grid,  represents choosing a different side of the triangle as reference side 0-1, which in general implies changing the scaling of the lattice, and rotating it. Each "curved triangle" in the image contains for each 2D lattice shape one complex number, the grey area is a canonical representation, corresponding to the classification above, with 0 and 1 two lattice points that are closest to each other; duplication is avoided by including only half of the boundary. The rhombic lattices are represented by the points on its boundary, with the hexagonal lattice as vertex, and i for the square lattice. The rectangular lattices are at the imaginary axis, and the remaining area represents the parallelogrammatic lattices, with the mirror image of a parallelogram represented by the mirror image in the imaginary axis.

Lattices in three dimensions

The 14 lattice types in 3D are called Bravais lattices. They are characterized by their space group. 3D patterns with translational symmetry of a particular type cannot have more, but may have less symmetry than the lattice itself.

Lattices in complex space

In Lie groups

More generally, a lattice Γ in a Lie group G is a discrete subgroup, such that the quotient G/Γ is of finite measure, for the measure on it inherited from Haar measure on G (left-invariant, or right-invariant—the definition is independent of that choice). That will certainly be the case when G/Γ is compact, but that sufficient condition is not necessary, as is shown by the case of the modular group in SL2(R), which is a lattice but where the quotient isn't compact (it has cusps). There are general results stating the existence of lattices in Lie groups.

A lattice is said to be uniform or cocompact if G/Γ is compact; otherwise the lattice is called non-uniform.

Lattices in general vector spaces

While we normally consider  lattices in  this concept can be generalized to any finite-dimensional vector space over any field. This can be done as follows:

Let K be a field, let V be an n-dimensional K-vector space, let  be a K-basis for V and let R be a ring contained within K. Then the R lattice  in V generated by B is given by:

In general, different bases B will generate different lattices.

Important cases of such lattices occur in number theory with K a p-adic field and R the p-adic integers.

For a vector space which is also an inner product space, the dual lattice can be concretely described by the set

or equivalently as

Related notions 
 A primitive element of a lattice is an element that is not a positive integer multiple of another element in the lattice.

See also

Lattice (order)
Lattice (module)
Reciprocal lattice
Unimodular lattice
Crystal system
Mahler's compactness theorem
Lattice graph
Lattice-based cryptography

Notes

References

External links
Catalogue of Lattices (by Nebe and Sloane)

 
Discrete groups
Lie groups
Analytic geometry